The 2016 SaskTel Tankard, the provincial men's curling championship for Saskatchewan, was held from February 3 to 7 at the Kindersley Curling Club in Kindersley. The winning team (Steve Laycock) represented Saskatchewan at the 2016 Tim Hortons Brier in Ottawa.

Teams
The teams are listed as follows:

Knockout Draw Brackets

A Event

B Event

C Event

Playoffs

1 vs 2

3 vs 4

Semifinal

Final

References

2016 Tim Hortons Brier
Curling in Saskatchewan
2016 in Saskatchewan